Toniann Pitassi  is a Canadian-American mathematician and computer scientist specializing in computational complexity theory. She is currently Jeffrey L. and Brenda Bleustein Professor of Engineering at Columbia University and was Bell Research Chair at the University of Toronto.

Academic career
A native of Pittsburgh, Pitassi earned bachelor's and master's degrees at Pennsylvania State University before moving to the University of Toronto for her doctoral studies; she earned her PhD in 1992 from Toronto under the supervision of Stephen Cook. After postdoctoral studies at the University of California, San Diego and faculty positions at the University of Pittsburgh and University of Arizona, she returned to Toronto in 2001, and was a professor in the University of Toronto Department of Computer Science and University of Toronto Department of Mathematics until 2021, when she joined the faculty of Columbia University.

She was an invited speaker at International Congress of Mathematicians in Berlin in 1998. She was the program chair for the 2012 Symposium on Theory of Computing. From September through December 2017, she was a Visiting Professor at the Institute for Advanced Study.

Research
Pitassi's research has largely focused on proof complexity, a branch of computational complexity theory that seeks upper and lower bounds on the lengths of mathematical proofs of logical propositions within various formalized proof systems. The goal of this study is to use these bounds to understand both the time complexity of proof-finding procedures, and the relative strengths of different proof systems.

Research contributions that she has made in this area include exponential lower bounds for Frege proofs of the pigeonhole principle, exponential lower bounds for the cutting-plane method applied to propositions derived from the maximum clique problem, exponential lower bounds for resolution proofs of dense random 3-satisfiability instances, and subexponential upper bounds for the same dense random instances using the Davis–Putnam algorithm. With Paul Beame, she also wrote a survey of proof complexity.

Recognition
Pitassi was elected as an ACM Fellow in 2018 for "contributions to research and education in the fields of computational and proof complexity".

Pitassi was also the recipient of the EATCS (European Association for Theoretical Computer Science) Award in 2021 for her "fundamental and wide-ranging contributions to computational complexity".

She was named to the National Academy of Sciences in 2022.

Selected publications
.
.
.
. Reprinted in Current Trends in Theoretical Computer Science, World Scientific, 2001, .
.
.

References

Living people
Canadian women mathematicians
Canadian women computer scientists
Canadian computer scientists
University of Toronto alumni
Pennsylvania State University faculty
University of Pittsburgh faculty
University of Arizona faculty
Academic staff of the University of Toronto
Theoretical computer scientists
Fellows of the Association for Computing Machinery
Year of birth missing (living people)
Columbia University faculty